The 2013–14 Colorado State Rams men's basketball team represented Colorado State University during the 2013–14 NCAA Division I men's basketball season. The team was coached by Larry Eustachy in his second season. They played their home games at the Moby Arena on Colorado State University's main campus in Fort Collins, Colorado and were a member of the Mountain West Conference. They finished the season 16–16, 7–11 in Mountain West play to finish in a tie for eighth place. They lost in the first round of the Mountain West Conference tournament to Utah State.

Departures

Recruiting

Roster

Schedule and results 

|-
!colspan=9 style="background:#00A550; color:#D4AF37;"| Exhibition

|-
!colspan=9 style="background:#00A550; color:#D4AF37;"| Regular season

|-
!colspan=9 style="background:#00A550; color:#D4AF37;"| Mountain West tournament

See also 
 2013–14 Colorado State Rams women's basketball team

References 

Colorado State
Colorado State Rams men's basketball seasons
Colorado State Rams
Colorado State Rams